JWH-193 is a drug from the aminoalkylindole and naphthoylindole families which acts as a cannabinoid receptor agonist. It was invented by the pharmaceutical company Sanofi-Winthrop in the early 1990s. JWH-193 has a binding affinity at the CB1 receptor of 6 nM, binding around seven times more tightly than the parent compound JWH-200, though with closer to twice the potency of JWH-200 in activity tests.

In the United States, all CB1 receptor agonists of the 3-(1-naphthoyl)indole class such as JWH-193 are Schedule I Controlled Substances.

Related compounds
A structural isomer of JWH-193 with the methyl group on the indole ring instead of the naphthoyl ring, was also found to be of similarly increased potency over JWH-200.

See also 
 JWH-122
 JWH-198

References 

JWH cannabinoids
Aminoalkylindoles
Naphthoylindoles
4-Morpholinyl compunds
Designer drugs
CB1 receptor antagonists